Hinkley is a surname. Notable people with the surname include:

 Aaron Hinkley (born 1999), English rugby union player
 Clayton Hinkley (born 1989), Australian rules footballer
 Daniel J. Hinkley, American horticulturist
 David V. Hinkley (1944–2019), American statistician
 George C. Hinkley (1862–1936), American businessman and politician
 Ken Hinkley (born 1966), Australian rules footballer and coach
 Leonard Hinkley (1839–1918), American politician in Wisconsin
 Tim Hinkley (born 1946), English musician
 Tommy Hinkley (born 1960), American actor
 Warren J. Hinkley (1870–1933), American politician

Fictional characters:
 Ralph Hinkley, character in the television series The Greatest American Hero
 Roy Hinkley, character in the television series Gilligan's Island

See also
Hinckley (surname)